James Leakey (1775–1865) was an English landscape and portrait artist.

Life
Born on 20 September 1775 in Exeter, Devon, he was the son of John Leakey, who was in the wool trade. At the time of Sir Joshua Reynolds's death he was about to become his pupil.

Leakey established himself at Exeter, painting portraits, miniatures and landscapes. He also produced small interiors with groups of rustic figures and Sir Francis Baring purchased one of those for £500. With the exception of time in London from 1821 to 1825, during which he was intimate with Thomas Lawrence, David Wilkie, and other leading painters, Leakey's life was mostly passed at Exeter. He died there on 16 February 1865.

Works

Leakey exhibited at the Royal Academy in 1821 The Marvellous Tale, in 1822 The Fortune Teller, in 1838 portraits and landscapes, and in 1846 The Distressed Wife.

Leakey was best known for his delicate miniatures, painted in oils on ivory. These brought him a local celebrity. In the Exeter Guildhall there is a portrait by him of Henry Blackhall, mayor of Exeter; also a copy by him of Reynolds's portrait of John Rolle Walter. His portrait of John Haddy James(1788-1869), surgeon, is in the Royal Devon and Exeter Hospital. In 1846 Leakey published a plate by Samuel Cousins, from his portrait of John Rashdall, minister of Bedford Chapel, Exeter.

Family
By his marriage in 1815 with Eliza Hubbard Woolmer, Leakey had eleven children. They included Caroline Leakey the writer.

He is the founding member of the Leakey family dynasty with branches specialising in archaeology and the military.

External links
 A poem by Letitia Elizabeth Landon from The Literary Souvenir, 1826 illustrative of a picture of that name, by Leaky (sic), then in the British Gallery.

Notes

Attribution

1775 births
1865 deaths
18th-century English painters
19th-century English painters
English landscape painters
English male painters
English portrait painters
James
Artists from Exeter
18th-century English male artists